Nyköping Municipality is a municipality in Södermanland County in southeast Sweden. Its seat is located in the city of Nyköping, which is containing a majority of the residents. Its southern tip in the district of Tunaberg is the southernmost point of mainland Svealand, one of the three original crowns forming Sweden.

The municipality was created in 1971 with the amalgamation of the City of Nyköping and a great number of other municipalities. It was split up in three parts in 1992, when Gnesta Municipality and Trosa Municipality were created. The rural areas of the modern municipality is a merger between the historical rural districts of Jönåker in the west and Rönö in the east, with a portion of the Jönåker hundred being replaced by the southeastern part of Oppunda. In the rural part of the municipality, the majority live in the many mostly inland villages where Stigtomta is the largest.

Geography

The following localities are large enough as in having more than 200 inhabitants to qualify under the Swedish definition of a locality. Many of these localities are former seats of rural municipalities.

 Nyköping (seat)
 Arnö (part of the Nyköping urban area)
 Bergshammar
 Buskhyttan
 Enstaberga
 Jönåker
 Nävekvarn
 Runtuna
 Sjösa
 Stavsjö
 Stigtomta
 Svalsta
 Vrena
 Tystberga
 Ålberga

Of those, only Buskhyttan, Nävekvarn and Sjösa are either onshore or near-coastal settlements, the rest being in the municipality's interior. Nävekvarn is the only other settlement than Nyköping to maintain a harbour and a seaside environment.

In addition there are numerous smaller settlements not large enough to meet the classification. The most significant of those are Aspa, Bränn-Ekeby, Koppartorp, Lappetorp, Lid, Lästringe, Ripsa, Råby and Svärta. Seaside mixed residence/holiday home areas also include Hummelvik, Horn, Skeppsvik, Svärdsklova, Uttervik, and Örstig.

The western area of the rural part of the municipality is more densely populated than the eastern side, with Stigtomta and the tri-village conurbation of Bergshammar, Svalsta and Enstaberga being located on that side. Skavsta Airport is also located in this section of the municipality. In 2018, there were 8,699 Swedish citizens of voting age registered in rural electoral wards set west of National Road 53 that goes roughly through the centre of the municipality compared to only 4,362 east of the road. This rendered 2/3 of the rural populace was in the western portion of the municipality.

The majority of residents, however, are living in Nyköping's urban area.

Bodies of water
Nyköping Municipality has a vast coastline on the Baltic Sea and several freshwater bodies.

Demographics
This is a demographic table based on Nyköping Municipality's electoral districts in the 2022 Swedish general election sourced from SVT's election platform, in turn taken from SCB official statistics.

Residents include everyone registered as living in the district, regardless of age or citizenship status. Valid voters indicate Swedish citizens above the age of 18 who therefore can vote in general elections. Left vote and right vote indicate the result between the two major blocs in said district in the 2022 general election. Employment indicates the share of people between the ages of 20 and 64 who are working taxpayers. Foreign background denotes residents either born abroad or with two parents born outside of Sweden. Median income is the received monthly income through either employment, capital gains or social grants for the median adult above 20, also including pensioners in Swedish kronor. College graduates indicates any degree accumulated after high school.

In total 56,507 people were resident, with 43,569 Swedish citizens of voting age. 50.6% voted for the left coalition and 48.1% for the right coalition. Of the 37 electoral districts, the median values were 82% employment, 85% Swedish background with 15% foreign background, a median income of 25,988 kronor and a college degree rate of 36%. With some of the largest districts having on average lower income, less employment, fewer college degree recipients and more people of foreign background, the averages would vary from said means.

Industry
The municipality has 3,000 companies but more than 50% are sole traders. Only 80 have more than 25 employees; of those 33 have more than 50 employees.

A former military airfield in the municipality serves now as a civilian airport called Stockholm-Skavsta Airport.

Education
Nyköping is the site of the Nyköpings Gymnasium, formerly consisting of two schools: Gripen and Tessin as well as a smaller one located within the Stockholm-Skavsta Airport. Tessin was a high school noted for the strength of its curricula in humanities, arts, and social studies. Gripen was instead noted for the science and technical programs. The merger between the two organizations eventually led to an expanded Gripen being the sole public high school in the municipality.

Tourist attraction
Nyköpingshus, a medieval castle, draws many thousands of tourists yearly, especially for its summer outdoor play, Nyköpings gästabud, dramatizing 14th-century events in which king Birger Magnusson and Queen Märta invited his two brothers Valdemar and Erik to the castle, ostensibly for a banquet of reconciliation after a civil war in which Valdemar and Erik had once imprisoned Birger. During the banquet at Nyköpingshus, Birger arrested Valdemar and Erik and committed them to the dungeon, where, according to legend, they starved to death.  Shortly thereafter supporters of Valdemar and Erik forced Birger and Märta to flee to Denmark.

Elections

Municipal elections

 1973
 1976
 1979
 1982
 1985
 1988
 1991
 1994
 1998
 2002
 2006
 2010
 2014
 2018

Riksdag elections

Only parties that have won representation during this timeframe are listed in results.

Sweden Democrats have their results from 1988 to 1998 listed as "0.0" even though those were decimals higher, since the SCB did not publish those results in detail at a municipal level since the party was not in realistic contention to enter the Riksdag. From 1991 Trosa Municipality and Gnesta Municipality had separate elections rending significant boundary changes.

See also

Nävsjön

Notes

External links

Nyköping Municipality - Official site

 
Municipalities of Södermanland County